The .375 Remington Ultra Magnum, also known as the .375 RUM is a .375 rifle cartridge introduced by Remington Arms in 2000.  The cartridge is intended for large and dangerous game. 

It is a beltless, rebated rim cartridge created by necking up the .300 Remington Ultra Magnum case to .375 caliber with no other changes. Factory loadings are less powerful than handloads for the cartridge.  Remington factory loads push a 300 grain (19 g) bullet at 2760 ft/s (840 m/s), producing 5070 ft·lbf (6.88 kJ) of energy.  A handloader can increase the muzzle velocity of a 300gr bullet to 3321 ft/s (900 m/s), and develop 5800 ft·lbf (7.9 kJ).

General information
The intended use of this cartridge includes hunting large, thick-skinned game.  It is powerful enough to kill any land animal and, with its high velocity, can do so at fairly long ranges. Such performance comes at the price of a heavy recoil:  in a sporting-weight rifle of ~8 lb (3.6 kg), this cartridge can produce a fierce 80 ft·lbf (108 J) of recoil (approximately 3.5 times that of a .30-06.)

There is a wide selection of .375 in (9.53 mm) bullets available that are suited to the high velocities of the .375 RUM, and boat tail bullets help to further extend the useful range.

Currently, there are no production rifles in this chambering
(Savage & Remington previously did so.)  Remington, DoubleTap and Nosler are the only sources of factory ammunition.  Loading dies and reloading data are readily available to the handloader. Double Tap loads to the specifications attributed to handloader limits.

See also
 List of rifle cartridges
 9 mm caliber other cartridges of similar size.
 Table of handgun and rifle cartridges

References

External links

 Cartridge Dimensions

Pistol and rifle cartridges
Remington Ultra Magnum rifle cartridges